Duncan Stutterheim (1971 in Purmerend) is a Dutch entrepreneur who is best known as the founder of the Dutch event company ID&T.

Career
At 18-years-old, Stutterheim founded a courier company. A year later in 1992, Stutterheim and friends Irfan van Ewijk and Theo Lelie organised a Hardcore house (gabber) party called The Final Exam in Utrecht, attracting 12,000 people. The success of that event led to the creation of ID&T, named for the initials of the three founders of the company, which became one of the largest organisers of dance music festivals in the Netherlands, responsible for festivals like Trance Energy, Tomorrowland, Sensation, Thunderdome, and Mysteryland.

In March 2013, Stutterheim sold 75% of the company to SFX Entertainment, a large American entertainment company. SFX paid 100 million dollars for ID&T.

In April 2015 Duncan quit the ID&T company.

Duncan Stutterheim is the son of Cor Stutterheim, one of the founders of the Dutch branch of CMG (Computer Management Group). Duncan is married and has three daughters.

References

1971 births
Living people
Dutch businesspeople
People from Purmerend